To Release Is to Resolve is the fifth album by American heavy metal band Byzantine, released independently on April 7, 2015. Out of four members of this band, only two returned from their previous album, lead vocalist Chris "OJ" Ojeda and drummer Matt Wolfe.

The first song of this album, "A Curious Lot", was streamed on February 3, 2015.

The album would be re-released by the band in Europe on August 5, 2016, containing the original track list as well as two new cover songs, "Dam That River" (originally performed by Alice In Chains), and "Pisschrist" (originally performed by Fear Factory).

Track listing

Personnel 
Chris "OJ" Ojeda – vocals, guitars
Matt Wolfe – drums
Brian "Hendo" Henderson – guitars
Sean Sydnor – bass

References 

2015 albums
Byzantine (band) albums